Diaulula boreopacifica is a species of sea slug, a dorid nudibranch, a shell-less marine gastropod mollusc in the family Discodorididae.

Distribution
This dorid nudibranch occurs in the northern Pacific, from Northern California to Alaska, Japan and Russia. It has been confused with Diaulula sandiegensis which has a more southerly range from California south to Baja California, Mexico.

Description
This nudibranch has a background colour which can be white or any shade of yellow to a yellowish brown with characteristic markings consisting of many brown spots of varying sizes. These spots are surrounded by a paler ring and extend into the outer part of the mantle. It grows to about 70 mm (3") in length.

Life habits
This species feeds on the sponge Haliclona sp.. It is most common in the intertidal region.

References

Discodorididae
Gastropods described in 2015